Thomasia petalocalyx, commonly known as paper flower, is a species of flowering plant in the family Malvaceae and is endemic to southern Australia. It is a shrub with wrinkled, oblong to egg-shaped leaves and cup-shaped mauve flowers.

Description 
The leaves are covered with star-shaped hairs, and the edges are wrinkled, turned down and finely toothed.

Taxonomy 
Thomasia petalocalyx was first formally described in 1855 by Ferdinand von Mueller and the description was published in his book Definitions of rare or hitherto undescribed Australian plants. The specific epithet (petalocalyx) refers to the petal-like sepals.

Distribution and habitat 
Paper flower grows in forest, woodland, coastal heath and on granite outcrops in the Esperance Plains, Jarrah Forest and Mallee bioregions of southern Western Australia, in the south-east of South Australia, including on Kangaroo Island, and in scattered locations in the west and south-west of Victoria, with an isolated population on Wilsons Promontory, where it is common.

References 

Taxa named by Ferdinand von Mueller
petalocalyx
Plants described in 1855
Flora of Western Australia
Flora of South Australia
Flora of Victoria (Australia)